Ruth Gilbert may refer to:

 Ruth Gilbert, English children's author who wrote under her maiden name, Ruth Ainsworth
 Ruth Gilbert (poet) (1917–2016), New Zealand poet
 Ruth Gilbert (actress) (1912–1993), American actress